This is a list of lists focused on lists of films based on actual events.  Additional entries should be added as they are created.

 List of films based on actual events (before 2000)
 List of films based on actual events (2000–present)
 List of films based on actual events in the 2000s
 List of films based on actual events in the 2010s
 List of films based on actual events in the 2020s
Actual events

See Also 
List of War films